Louise Pedersen (born 19 January 1979 in Odder, Denmark) is a Danish handball player who plays in the Norwegian club Våg Vipers.

She has previously played in Odder, in Århus KFUM, Horsens HK, Viborg HK, Kolding IF, Aalborg DH and Odense GOG. She also plays on the Danish national team. She has participated in both European Championships and World Championships and won a Danish championship with Viborg HK in 2001/02

References 
 Player info 
 Louise Pedersen kvitter landsholdet 
 Louise Pedersen tilbage på landsholdet 
 Louise Pedersen klar til norsk  håndbold 
 Louise Pedersen vil med til VM 

1979 births
Living people
Danish female handball players
Expatriate handball players
Danish expatriate sportspeople in Norway
KIF Kolding players
People from Odder Municipality
Sportspeople from the Central Denmark Region